"The Clouded Image" was an American television play broadcast on November 7, 1957, as part of the second season of the CBS television series Playhouse 90. James P. Cavanaugh wrote the teleplay, as an adaptation of Josephine Tey's novel Brat Farrar. Franklin Schaffner directed, and Martin Manulis was the producer. Farley Granger, Judith Anderson, and Vincent Price starred.

Plot
A young stranger, Brat Farrar, shows up claiming to be the twin brother of a young Englishman, Peter Ashby, who is set to inherit a huge fortune. Farrar claim to have a right to half of the estate. Farley Granger plays the roles of both Peter Ashby and Brat Farrar.

Cast
The following performers received screen credit for their performances:

 Farley Granger - Peter Ashby/Brat Farrar
 Judith Anderson - Aunt Bee
 Terry Moore - Eleanor
 Vincent Price - Alex
 Patty McCormack - Jane
 John Williams - Sandal

References

1957 television plays
1957 American television episodes
Playhouse 90 (season 2) episodes